Folarskardnuten is the highest point on Hallingskarvet, and is also the highest point in the county Viken of Norway.

The mountain lies within Hallingskarvet National Park.

See also
List of highest points of Norwegian counties

References

Highest points of Norwegian counties
Mountains of Viken